Mynkivtsi  is a selo in Kamianets-Podilskyi Raion, Khmelnytskyi Oblast  (province), Ukraine. The village is located on the river Ushytsya, 43 km away from the railway station Dunaivtsi and 89 km away from Khmelnytskyi. Mynkivtsi belongs to Dunaivtsi urban hromada, one of the hromadas of Ukraine. Its population was 1,479 inhabitants in 2001.

Until 18 July 2020, Mynkivtsi belonged to Dunaivtsi Raion. The raion was abolished in July 2020 as part of the administrative reform of Ukraine, which reduced the number of raions of Khmelnytskyi Oblast to three. The area of Dunaivtsi Raion was merged into Kamianets-Podilskyi Raion.

References

External links

 
 Website of village
 The murder of the Jews of Mynkivtsi during World War II, at Yad Vashem website.

Ushitsky Uyezd
Holocaust locations in Ukraine

Villages in Kamianets-Podilskyi Raion